The Poet & The Piper is a studio album by poet Seamus Heaney and piper Liam O'Flynn, recorded in 2003 and released in the same year. The album is made up of instrumental tracks and spoken poetry, both often mixed together. The recording features traditional and contemporary music, lyrics and poetry such as An Bonnán Buí, one of the oldest known Irish traditional songs. The album was used as a soundtrack for television programme Keeping Time broadcast on both RTÉ and the BBC.

Track listing
 The Given Note / Port na bPúcaí
 Digging
 Bogland
 Árdaí Chuain
 At the Wellhead
 The Otter
 The Rolling Wave / The Hag's Money
 The Yellow Bittern (An Bonnán Buí)
 The Yellow Bittern / The Broken Pledge
 The Glamoured (Gile na Gile)
 Aisling Gheal
 The Tollund Man
 Midterm Break
 Sliabh Gallon's Brae
 Clearances 3
 Clearances 5
 Cronán na Máthar
 Two Lorries
 The Humours of Castlebernard / The Bank of Turf
 A Call
 Seeing Things - Section 3
 Fáinne Geal an Lae
 St. Kevin and the Blackbird
 Open the Door for Three
 The Annals Say
 Postscript
 Garret Barry's Reel / Seán Reid's Favourite

Personnel
Seamus Heaney – Spoken word
Liam O'Flynn – uilleann pipes, tin whistle
Stephen Cooney – guitar
Rod McVey – harmonium

External links
 The Poet & The Piper at Amazon.com

2003 albums
Seamus Heaney albums
Liam O'Flynn albums
Folk albums by Irish artists